Ernst Heinrich Dietrich Reckeweg (April 18, 1873 – September 5, 1944) was an American gymnast and track and field athlete who competed in the 1904 Summer Olympics. He was born in the German Empire.

In 1904 he won the gold medal in the team event. He was also 19th in athletics' triathlon event, 47th in gymnastics all-around event and 67th in gymnastics triathlon event.

References

External links
 Ernst Reckeweg's profile at databaseOlympics

1873 births
1944 deaths
Athletes (track and field) at the 1904 Summer Olympics
Gymnasts at the 1904 Summer Olympics
Olympic gymnasts of the United States
Olympic gold medalists for the United States in track and field
American male artistic gymnasts
Olympic medalists in gymnastics
Medalists at the 1904 Summer Olympics
American male triathletes